Von Rolfe Villaseñor Pessumal (born February 12, 1993) is a Filipino professional basketball player for the Barangay Ginebra San Miguel of the Philippine Basketball Association (PBA).

College career

Pessumal played college ball at the Ateneo de Manila University, and was a part of two championships for the Blue Eagles. He ended his college playing career in 2015. He made a name for himself in the Seniors division as a sharpshooter, who also had the ability to put the ball on the floor and finish at the rim.

College statistics

|-
| style="text-align:left; background:#afe6ba;" |  2011-12†
| align=left | 
| 7 || 2.0 || .000 || .000 || .500 || .4 || .4 || .0 || .0 || 0.1
|-
| style="text-align:left; background:#afe6ba;"  |  2012-13†
| align=left | 
| 10 || 6.3 || .167 || .111 || .500 || .1 || .0 || .0 || .0 || 0.8
|-
| align=left | 2013-14
| align=left | 
| 14 || 15.7 || .354 || .282 || .909 || 2.9 || .9 || .2 || .2 || 5.5
|-
| align=left | 2014-15
| align=left| 
| 16 || 25.6 || .373 || .380 || .789 || 4.0 || .9 || .5 || .2 || 9.1
|-
| align=left | 2015-16
| align=left | 
| 13 || 30.2 || .390 || .430 || .794 || 2.3 || 2.5 || 1.2 || 1.2 || 17.2

Amateur career

PBA D-League

Pessumal is one of the 215 aspirants for the 2015 PBA D-League draft, which took place on December 1, 2015. On December 1, 2015, he was drafted third overall by the Tanduay Light Rhum Masters in the PBA D-League draft held at PBA Café in Metrowalk, Pasig City.

Professional career
In October 2016, Pessumal was drafted by the GlobalPort Batang Pier from Special Draft.

In July 2017, Pessumal was traded by the GlobalPort Batang Pier to San Miguel Beermen in exchange for seldom used Arnold Van Opstal.

On January 27, 2019, Pessumal recorded 23 points and 6 3-pointers in a 93–104 losing effort the TNT Katropa. In June 2019, he set the PBA record for most threes made in a game without missing, going 8 for 8 in another loss to the TNT Katropa, this time the score 110–97.

On September 20, 2022, Pessumal was traded to the Barangay Ginebra San Miguel in a three-team trade involving Barangay Ginebra, San Miguel, and NorthPort Batang Pier.

PBA career statistics

As of the end of 2021 season

Season-by-season averages

|-
| align=left rowspan=2| 
| align=left | GlobalPort
| rowspan=2|31 || rowspan=2|13.6 || rowspan=2|.320 || rowspan=2|.333 || rowspan=2|.929 || rowspan=2|1.9 || rowspan=2|.5 || rowspan=2|.2 || rowspan=2|.1 || rowspan=2|4.4
|-
| align=left | San Miguel
|-
| align=left | 
| align=left | San Miguel
| 37 || 10.7 || .358 || .291 || .546 || 1.0 || .4 || .2 || .2 || 3.5
|-
| align=left | 
| align=left | San Miguel
| 60 || 15.0 || .417 || .406 || .750 || 1.6 || .4 || .4 || .2 || 5.7
|-
| align=left | 
| align=left | San Miguel
| 13 || 16.8 || .345 || .312 || .692 || 2.6 || .8 || .5 || .0 || 6.6
|-
| align=left | 
| align=left | San Miguel
| 23 || 12.7 || .355 || .299 || .700 || 1.4 || .6 || .4 || .1 || 4.0
|-class=sortbottom
| align="center" colspan=2 | Career
| 164 || 13.6 || .372 || .351 || .768 || 1.5 || .5 || .3 || .1 || 4.8

Personal life
Since 2014, Pessumal has been in a relationship with former UAAP courtside reporter and beauty queen Laura Lehmann. They were both students at the Ateneo de Manila University when they first met. In May 2020, they announced their engagement after being together for five years. On May 23, 2021, he announced his marriage to Lehmann, which was solemnized in a civil ceremony earlier that year.

References

External links

1993 births
Living people
Ateneo Blue Eagles men's basketball players
Barangay Ginebra San Miguel players
Basketball players from Manila
Competitors at the 2017 Southeast Asian Games
Filipino men's basketball players
Filipino people of Indian descent
NorthPort Batang Pier draft picks
NorthPort Batang Pier players
Philippine Basketball Association All-Stars
Philippines men's national basketball team players
San Miguel Beermen players
Shooting guards
Small forwards
Southeast Asian Games gold medalists for the Philippines
Southeast Asian Games medalists in basketball
Sportspeople of Indian descent